American Soldiers is a 2005 war film directed by Sidney J. Furie.

Premise
Iraq, 2004: during a routine sortie a US patrol is ambushed and the young soldiers are forced to put their training and skills into action fast. A determined foe with superior local knowledge, the Fedayeen insurgents soon draw them into close quarter combat and a desperate fight for survival.

Cast

References

External links
 
 

2005 films
Films directed by Sidney J. Furie
2000s war films
Films about the United States Army
Canadian war films
2000s English-language films
2000s Canadian films